Deep Cuts, Volume 2 (1977–1982) is a compilation of Queen tracks between 1977 and 1982. Like its predecessor, Volume 1, it contains Queen songs that are less well known.

Track listing

Personnel

Freddie Mercury: lead and backing vocals, piano, synthesizer, keyboards, synth bass on "Staying Power".
Brian May: lead guitar, lead vocals on "Sail Away Sweet Sister" and "Sleeping on the Sidewalk", falsetto vocals on "Put out the Fire", backing vocals, synthesizer, percussion.
 Roger Taylor: drums, percussion, lead vocals on "Rock it (Prime Jive), co-lead vocals on "Sheer Heart Attack and "Action This Day", backing vocals, synthesizer, rhythm guitar and bass guitar on "Sheer Heart Attack".
John Deacon: bass guitar, acoustic guitar, synthesizer, rhythm guitar on "Staying Power".

References

2011 compilation albums
Queen (band) compilation albums
Island Records compilation albums